Vijayawada formerly known as Bezawada, is the second most populous city in the Indian state of Andhra Pradesh. It is the administrative headquarters of the NTR district and a part of State's Capital Region. Vijayawada lies on the banks of Krishna River and Budameru Rivulet surrounded by the hills of Eastern Ghats, known as Indrakeeladri Hills.

Religious Places 
Vijayawada is considered to be a sacred place for famous temples, churches, mosques and jain temples. It also serves as the ritual host of Pushkaram (a river worshipping ritual in India) of River Krishna.
 Kanaka Durga Temple: One of the most popular temples in and around Vijayawada, located on the Indrakeeladri on the banks of Krishna River. Kanaka Durga Temple is a Hindu Temple dedicated to Goddess Kanaka Durga. The temple is located in the heart of Vijayawada and is a 10 minute drive from the Vijayawada Railway Station and Vijayawada Bus Station, while being about 20 kilometre away from the Vijayawada Airport. Buses depart for the temple from both the bus stand and railway station every 20 minutes. One can either motor up the ghat road or take to the steps on foot. During Dasara, a special pujas are performed for 9 days known as Navaratri festival. This Navaratri festival is celebrated in this temple for every year. A large number of pilgrims from the city and its environs visited the temple after a holy dip in the River Krishna.
 Sri Subrahmanya Swami Temple: Dedicated to the Lord of serpents Kartikeya, the Subramanya Swamy Temple is a shrine located in Vijayawada, set on the foot of the Indrakiladari Hills. The temple worships all three forms of Lord Subramanya- Sri Dandayudhapani Swamy as a boy, Sri Valli Devayanai- his original form and lastly in the form of a serpent. It is carved out of sparkling white stone with intricate stonework embellishing the facade. The temple also houses a silver covered Garuda pillar which holds great religious significance for the devotees.
 Akkanna Madanna Caves: Akkanna Madanna Caves are located at the foothills of the Indrakeeladri Hill in close proximity to the famous Kanaka Durga Temple. As per legends, these beautiful caves date back to the 7-century and are dedicated to Akkanna and Madanna who were ministers in the court of Quli Qutub Shah, the Nawab of Golconda. The rock-cut caves are triple-celled with pillared hall and are devoid of any ornamental moulding or sculpture. This architecture echoes the richness of the bygone era and the tragic end of the two great secretariats of Qutub Shah. The temple encompassed in the caves was constructed in the 17-century and there is a predecessor cave nearby that belongs to 2-century with idols of Trimurti, Brahma, Vishnu and Shiva.
Moghalrajapuram Caves:
 Temple:
 Temple:
 Devasthanam:
 Thirtha:
 Temple:
 Caves:

Landmarks 

 Prakasam Barrage: The original dam across the Krishna was built over a 150 years ago. The dam construction was started in 1852 and completed in 1855. And the present structure dates to the 1950s. Several canals through the city of Vijayawada terminate in a lake behind the barrage.
 Krishnaveni mandapam: It is also known as the river museum and located at the side of Prakasam Barrage. It was constructed by the Krishna Industrial and Agricultural Exhibition society which consists of geographical route map of River Krishna, world currency, Krishnamma Idol etc.
 Undavalli caves: Located in Other side of the Krishna River, five kilometers from Vijayawada, these caves are said to have been carved in the 7th century A.D. Buddhist monks used this two-storey cave structure as a rest house during the monsoon. A huge monolith of the Buddha in reclining posture is a magnificent sight.
 Rajiv Gandhi Park: Created by the Vijayawada Municipal Corporation with great care, this park welcomes the tourists at the entrance of the city with its impressive horticultural network. It includes a mini zoo and a musical water fountain. This park is open from 2pm to 8pm.
 Gandhi Hill: The first Gandhi memorial with seven stupas in the country was constructed on this hill at a height of 500 ft (150 m). The 52 ft (16 m) stupa was unveiled on 6 October 1968 by Dr. Zakir Hussain, the President of India. Gandhi Memorial Library, a sound and light show on Mahatma Gandhi's life and a planetarium are the other attractions.
 Victoria Jubilee Museum: A place for archaeology lovers, this museum has a carefully preserved collection of ancient sculptures, paintings, idols, weapons, cutlery, and inscriptions. This museum is closed temporarily due to repair works.
 Mogalarajapuram Caves: These caves are said to be excavated in the 5th century A.D. They are reputed to be the first of their kind in South India. The idols of Nataraja, Vinayaka and Arthanareeswara are carved here, but none of the statues are available here.
 Bhavani Island: Perhaps one of the largest islands on a river, Bhavani Island is located on Krishna River close to the city. AP Tourism is converting this 133-acre (54 hectare) island into an attractive tourist spot and a riverfront resort.

Religious tourism 

Kanaka Durga Temple: One of the most popular temples in and around Vijayawada, it is located on an Indrakeeladri hill overlooking the city as well as the River Krishna. One can either motor up the ghat road or take to the steps on foot. Inscriptions of different dynasties are found in the temple. During Vijayadashami festival, thousands of devotees from the city and its environs throng the temple after a holy dip in the River Krishna ybraen.
Marakata Rajarajeswari Temple: A unique temple of the goddess completely built with stone with intricate architecture symbolizing SRICHAKRA - the abode of mother Goddess.
Subramanya Swamy Temple: One of the most popular temples in Vijayawada, it is located on a hill (Indrakeeladri) overlooking the city as well as the River Krishna. One can take to the steps on foot. During Skanda Shashti Festival, thousands of devotees come from the city.  Many regular devotees will come from Tamil Nadu. This temple is  maintained by the Iddipilli family.
Sri Nagarala Sri Maha Lakshmi Ammavaru Temple: One of the most popular temples in Vijayawada, it is located in the area of Chiitinagar. During Dasara Festival, thousands of devotees from the city visit this temple. It is maintained by the Nagaralu community.
Mangalagiri: Located in Guntur district, 12 km from Vijayawada is the renowned temple of Narasimha in Mangalagiri, on a hillock. The unique feature of this temple is that the mouth of the idol accepts half the quantity of panakam (jaggery dissolved in water) offered by devotees, irrespective of the size of the vessel.
Hazarat Bal Mosque: A holy relic of the Prophet Mohammed is kept here which is displayed once a year. A large number of non-Muslims also join the celebrations.
Hinkar Thirtha, Mangalagiri, Guntur district: A Jain temple here with great artistic work, it is slated to be the biggest Jain temple in the region.
Gunadala Mary Matha Church: In 1925, Rf. Arlati, the Rector of St. Joseph's Orphanage at Gunadala, installed a statue of Our Lady and later a church was built and consecrated in 1971, now popularly known as St. Mary's church. Since then the Feast of Our Lady of Lourdes became an annual event here, attended by hundreds of people. The church is situated on a hillock on the eastern side of the city.

References 

Vijayawada, List of tourist attractions
Vijayawada
Tourist attractions in Vijayawada